The Cincinnati Reds are an American professional baseball franchise based in Cincinnati, Ohio. They are members of the National League Central Division in Major League Baseball. In chronological order, the Reds have played their home games in the Bank Street Grounds, League Park, the Palace of the Fans, Redland Field (later known as Crosley Field), and Riverfront Stadium (later known as Cinergy Field). Since 2003, the Reds have played their home games at Great American Ball Park.

There have been sixty-one different managers in the team's franchise history: four while it was known as the Cincinnati Red Stockings (1882–1889), four while it was known as the Cincinnati Redlegs (1953–1958) and the other fifty-three under the Cincinnati Reds (1882–1952, 1959–present). In baseball, the head coach of a team is called the manager, or more formally, the field manager. Pop Snyder was the first manager of the Reds and managed from 1882 to 1884. Sparky Anderson is the franchise's all-time leader in regular-season games managed (1,450) and regular-season game wins (863). He is followed by Bill McKechnie in both categories with 1,386 and 744, respectively. Anderson is the only Reds manager to have won the World Series twice, in 1975 and 1976. Pat Moran, Lou Piniella, and McKechnie have one World Series victory each; Moran was the manager during the Black Sox Scandal, which refers to the events that took place in the 1919 World Series. McKechnie led the team to the championship in 1940, while Piniella led the team to it in 1990. Jack McKeon is the only manager to have won the Manager of the Year Award with the Reds, which he won in 1999. The most recent manager of the Reds is David Bell, and the current owner is Robert Castellini.

The manager with the highest winning percentage over a full season or more was Pop Snyder, with a winning percentage of .648. Conversely, the worst winning percentage over a full season or more in franchise history is .382 by Donie Bush, who posted a 58–94 record during the  season.

Key

Note: Linked years link to the corresponding Major League Baseball season or year in baseball.

Managers

Note
  Each year is linked to an article about that particular MLB season.

References
General

Specific

External links
Cincinnati Reds at Baseball-Reference.com

Cincinnati Reds
Managers